Damián Martínez may refer to:

 Damián Martínez (footballer, born January 1990), Argentine defender
 Damián Martínez (footballer, born June 1990), Argentine forward
 Emiliano Martínez, Argentine goalkeeper
 Punishment Martinez, American professional wrestler